Ptilothrix relata is a species of chimney bee in the family Apidae. It is found in South America.

References

Further reading

 

Apinae
Insects described in 1903